Eld Peak is a prominent peak,  high, rising  southeast of Reynolds Peak on the west side of Matusevich Glacier in Antarctica. Two conical peaks were sighted in the area from the Peacock on 16 January 1840, by Passed Midshipmen Henry Eld and William Reynolds of the United States Exploring Expedition (USEE) (1838–42). The southeastern peak was named for Eld by USEE leader Lieutenant Charles Wilkes. 

In 1959 Phillip Law of the Australian National Antarctic Research Expedition made investigations of features in this area. Reference to Wilkes' narrative showed that the recorded descriptions of the peaks sighted by Eld and Reynolds were in accord with photographs of the peaks on the west side of Matusevich Glacier. The peak described was selected by Law to commemorate Wilkes' naming.

References 

Mountains of Oates Land